Robert M. Estalella [es-tah-LAY-yah] (born August 23, 1974) is an American former professional baseball catcher, who played in Major League Baseball (MLB) from 1996 to 2004. His name is similar to that of his grandfather, Bobby Estalella (1911 – 1991), a Cuban professional baseball outfielder who played in the big leagues between 1935 and 1949.

Baseball career
In nine seasons, Estalella played for the Philadelphia Phillies (1996–1999), San Francisco Giants (2000–2001), New York Yankees (2001), Colorado Rockies (2002–2003), Arizona Diamondbacks (2004) and Toronto Blue Jays (2004). Estalella was a career .216 hitter with 48 home runs and 147 RBI in 310 games.

He was signed by the Cincinnati Reds to a minor league contract before the 2005 season but chose free-agency during spring training. He was signed by the New York Mets to a minor league contract before the 2006 season, but elected free agency as he re-injured his (r) shoulder and elbow before the season began requiring surgery. In Aug 2010 had (r)hip surgery and have been denied the opportunity to rejoin a team after extensive rehab.

Estalella holds the distinction of having hit the most career home runs in MLB history by a player who also had fewer than 200 career hits. (48 HR; 195H)

BALCO scandal
Estalella was linked to the BALCO steroids scandal through leaked testimony. On December 13, 2007, he was named in the Mitchell Report to the Commissioner of Baseball of an Independent Investigation Into the Illegal Use of Steroids and Other Performance Enhancing Substances by Players in Major League Baseball. On January 29, 2009, it was reported Estalella would not be testifying against Barry Bonds in the federal perjury case against Bonds.

See also
List of Major League Baseball players named in the Mitchell Report

References

External links

1974 births
Living people
American expatriate baseball players in Canada
American sportspeople of Cuban descent
Arizona Diamondbacks players
Baseball players from Florida
Colorado Rockies players
Colorado Springs Sky Sox players
Columbus Clippers players
Drugs in sport in the United States
Fresno Grizzlies players
Major League Baseball catchers
New York Yankees players
Philadelphia Phillies players
San Francisco Giants players
Toronto Blue Jays players